Meimanat Hosseini-Chavoshi is an Iranian demographer and a Research Fellow at the Australian National University.
She won Iran's Book of the Year Award for the book The Fertility Transition in Iran: Revolution and Reproduction (with Peter McDonald and Mohammad Jalal Abbasi-Shavazi).

See also
 List of foreign nationals detained in Iran

References

Iranian demographers
Iranian expatriate academics
Academic staff of the Australian National University
Academic staff of the University of Melbourne
Year of birth missing (living people)
Living people
Australian National University alumni
Prisoners and detainees of Iran
Iranian emigrants to Australia
Iran's Book of the Year Awards recipients